Pape is an unincorporated community in St. Clair County, in the U.S. state of Missouri.

The community has the name of Gideon Pape, the proprietor of a local mill.  A variant name was "Old Tiffin".

References

Unincorporated communities in St. Clair County, Missouri
Unincorporated communities in Missouri